Jonas Petter Renkse (born 19 May 1975) is a Swedish musician in the bands Katatonia (1991–) as lead vocalist, founder, songwriter (1991–1994, 1997–) and formerly as drummer (1991–1994, 1996–1998); in Bloodbath (1998–) as bassist, founder, songwriter; and in Wisdom of Crowds (2013–) as co-vocalist.
 
He was also the founding member, drummer, vocalist, guitarist & songwriter of the band October Tide.

History
In 1995 Katatonia was put on a halt due to not having a suitable lineup, and Renkse subsequently decided to form October Tide.

In 1996, Jonas' performance of death vocals had taken such a toll that by 1997 he would only sing cleanly. By 1998, Renkse decided he would focus strictly on vocals and abandon drums.

Renkse wanted to guest on The Ocean's album, Precambrian but due to Katatonia's touring schedule during the production, The Ocean was not able to approach him on time. He would later appear on the track "Devonian: Nascent" off of their 2018 release Phanerozoic I: Paleozoic, as well as "Jurassic | Cretaceous" from the 2020 release Phanerozoic II: Mesozoic & Cenozoic.

Personal life
Renkse has three children, and is best friends with singer Mikael Åkerfeldt of the band Opeth. Åkerfeldt recorded part of the Blackwater Park album at Renkse's house.

Discography

With Katatonia

 Dance of December Souls (1993)
 Brave Murder Day (1996)
 Discouraged Ones (1998)
 Tonight's Decision (1999)
 Last Fair Deal Gone Down (2001)
 Viva Emptiness (2003)
 The Great Cold Distance (2006)
 Night Is the New Day (2009)
 Dead End Kings (2012)
 The Fall of Hearts (2016)
 City Burials (2020)
 Sky Void of Stars (2023)

With Bloodbath
 Breeding Death (2000) – bass, songwriting & backing vocals
 Resurrection Through Carnage (2002) – bass, songwriting, backing vocals, production, engineering & photography 
 Nightmares Made Flesh (2004) – bass, songwriting, backing vocals & guitar
 Unblessing the Purity (2008) – bass, songwriting & art direction
 The Fathomless Mastery (2008) – bass, songwriting (2, 3, 6, 8 & 11)
 The Wacken Carnage (2008, CD/DVD) – bass, songwriting 
 Bloodbath over Bloodstock (2011, DVD) – bass, songwriting (1–8, 10–12, 14–18)
 Grand Morbid Funeral (2014, CD) – bass, songwriting
 The Arrow of Satan Is Drawn (2018) – bass, songwriting

With October Tide
 Rain Without End (1997)
 Grey Dawn (1999)
 Tunnel of No Light (2013) – Lyrics

Bruce Soord with Jonas Renkse
 Wisdom of Crowds (2013)

With KORDA
 Sialia/Chrome Eyes (2022, Single)
 Lucent (2022, Single)
 Chaser (2022, Single)

Lyrics
"Losing Myself" from Infernal by Edge of Sanity (1997)

Producer
"Still Day Beneath the Sun" by Opeth (2002)

Guest vocals
 "The Justice of Suffering" from Hope by Swallow the Sun (2007)
 "01011001" by Ayreon (2008)
 "Nearing Grave" from Avoid the Light by Long Distance Calling (2009)
 "Ascending" from Worlds I Create by Pantheon I (2009)
 "Waking Dreams" on "Ayreon Universe – The Best of Ayreon Live" tour and album by Ayreon (2017)
 "Comatose" on "Ayreon Universe – The Best of Ayreon Live" tour and album by Ayreon (2017)
 "The Silence" on "Off The Cross – ERA EP" album by Off The Cross (2018)
"Devonian: Nascent" on "Phanerozoic I: Palaeozoic" album by The Ocean Collective (2018)
"Jurassic | Cretaceous" on "Phanerozoic II: Mesozoic & Cenozoic" album by The Ocean Collective (2020)

Equipment

Vocals
Shure Beta 87a (Microphone)
TC-Helicon Voicelive2 (Vocal Processor)

Other
Sennheiser G2 (In-Ear Monitor System)

Guitars
Ibanez 1975 Cherry (Electric)
Session Acoustic Steel Six-strings (Acoustic)

Bass
Morgan Legend Series Jazz (black)
Ibanez EDB405
Mayones Guitars & Basses Jabba-5

References

External links
 Interview with Jonas Renkse at Blabbermouth.net
 Jonas Renkse

1975 births
Death metal musicians
English-language singers from Sweden
Swedish heavy metal singers
Swedish singer-songwriters
Living people
Swedish bass guitarists
Swedish drummers
Bloodbath members
Katatonia members
21st-century Swedish singers
21st-century Swedish male singers